The Gardens of Stone National Park is a protected national park that is located in the Central Tablelands region of New South Wales in eastern Australia. The national park draws its name from the natural stone pagodas within its boundaries.

The Gardens of Stone National Park is one of the eight protected areas that, in 2000, was inscribed to form part of the UNESCO World Heritagelisted Greater Blue Mountains Area. The national park forms part of the Great Dividing Range.

Features and location
The most prominent features of the park are the sandstone pagoda landscapes and cliffs and canyons. Limestone outcrops, karsts and elevated swamps are other unusual features.

The park is bounded on the west by the Castlereagh Highway; to the north by the Glen Davis Road; to the east by the Wollemi National Park; and to the south by the Newnes State Forest, the Wolgan Valley, and the Wolgan State Forest.

History
The Newnes Plateau region was proposed for conservation in 1932 as part of a Greater Blue Mountains National Park by the National Parks and Primitive Areas Council. Lobbying for protecting the area increased after the establishment of Wollemi National Park in 1979. The National Parks Association proposed its extension westwards in 1984, which developed into a detailed proposal of an  park in 1993, which was ultimately successful. The Gardens of Stone National Park was established in 1994; however, the initial park only covered , omitting areas which contain coal deposits. Environmentalist groups seek to protect more of the surrounding area, which includes pagodas, canyons, heathland and elevated swamps.

Flora and fauna
A total of 423 native plant species have been recorded in the park in 30 different plant communities. Most of the park is covered in open forest or woodland dominated by eucalypts. In the west of the park, there are ironbark (Eucalyptus fibrosa and E. crebra) and yellow box (Eucalyptus melliodora) woodlands that grow on clay loam and are a habitat for the rare regent honeyeater and turquoise parrot. There is white box (Eucalyptus albens) woodland in the southwest and scribbly gum (Eucalyptus rossii and  E. sparsifolia) woodland on the park's eastern borders.

The plant and animal communities of the pagoda formations are fragile and easily irreversibly damaged by human activity. Collection of bush rocks for gardens and landscaping removes habitat for reptiles.

See also

 Protected areas of New South Wales

References

External links

Dingo Gap photos of GOS NP

National parks of New South Wales
Protected areas established in 1994
Parks and reserves of the Blue Mountains (New South Wales)
1994 establishments in Australia
Central Tablelands